Jenne Farm is a farm located in Reading, Vermont. It is one of the most photographed farms in the world, especially in autumn. The farm has appeared in magazine covers, photography books, and several Budweiser television advertisements; it has also served as a setting in the films Forrest Gump and Funny Farm. Photographs of the farm have appeared on posters, postcards and wall calendars.

Despite its fame, the private farm is located along a dirt road and is not heavily promoted. The only sign indicating its presence is a tiny board along Vermont Route 106 advertising maple syrup.

The farm became noted for photogenic scenery about 1955 when a photography school in South Woodstock discovered it. Later, it appeared as an entry in a Life photo contest, on the cover of Yankee magazine, and in Vermont Life.

Gallery

References

Landmarks in Vermont
Buildings and structures in Reading, Vermont
Farms in Vermont